"If It Don't Come Easy" is a song written by Dave Gibson and Craig Karp, and recorded by American country music artist Tanya Tucker.  It was released in February 1988 as the third single from the album Love Me Like You Used To.  The song was Tucker's ninth number one on the country chart.  The single went to number one for one week and spent fourteen weeks on the country chart.

Charts

Weekly charts

Year-end charts

References

1988 singles
1987 songs
Tanya Tucker songs
Capitol Records Nashville singles
Song recordings produced by Jerry Crutchfield
Songs written by Dave Gibson (American songwriter)